Michelle Lawrence is a former state legislator and county commissioner. She served in the Colorado House of Representatives from 1991 to 1994. She is a Republican.

She chaired the Jefferson County Board of Commissioners. She represented Jefferson County.

Scott McInnis gave a congressional speech in tribute to her work in 2004.

References

Year of birth missing (living people)
Living people
Women state legislators in Colorado
People from Jefferson County, Colorado
County commissioners in Colorado
Republican Party members of the Colorado House of Representatives
20th-century American politicians
20th-century American women politicians